Hans Bertil Ljungberg (26 March 1948 – 31 July 2020) was a Swedish swimmer who won a bronze medal at the 1970 European Aquatics Championships. He competed at the 1968 and 1972 Summer Olympics in eight freestyle, medley and backstroke events; his best achievement was the fourth place in the 4 × 200 m freestyle relay in 1972.

In the 1960s he studied at the California State University, Long Beach. In the 2000s, he was still competing in the masters category.

References

External links

Hans Ljungberg. Sveriges Olympiska Kommitté

1948 births
2020 deaths
Swedish male backstroke swimmers
Swedish male freestyle swimmers
Swedish male medley swimmers
Swimmers at the 1968 Summer Olympics
Swimmers at the 1972 Summer Olympics
Olympic swimmers of Sweden
European Aquatics Championships medalists in swimming
Swimmers from Stockholm
20th-century Swedish people